Living Legends is an American hip hop supergroup consisting of indie hip hop artists from California. Beginning in the mid 1990s, the crew garnered a following by recording, promoting and performing their music independently through Legendary Music.

The crew is considered by LA Weekly to be "one of the biggest success stories of the indie-rap movement, having sold close to 300,000 units of their various solo and group efforts — all by them-damn-selves."

History
Living Legends originally grew out of Mystik Journeymen, consisted of BFAP (now known as Sunspot Jonz) and PSC (now known as Luckyiam). Beginning in 1994, the Mystik Journeymen began cultivating a fan base by selling their own tapes on the streets and hosting "Underground Survivors" shows in East Oakland. In 1995, the duo met The Grouch. They soon embarked on the first of several of self-funded tours throughout Europe. In 1996, Mystik Journeymen and The Grouch joined with the trio known as 3 Melancholy Gypsys (Eligh, Scarub, and Murs) of Los Angeles. They formed Living Legends in late 1990s. The crew has since grown to include Bicasso, Aesop and Arata.

The group and its members have founded and operated several imprints, including Outhouse Records and Revenge Entertainment. In 1999, Living Legends moved their base of operations to Los Angeles.

In May 2012, Murs quit the group. In June that year, The Grouch announced hiatus from the group.

In 2016, the group (Aesop, Bicasso, Eligh, Luckyiam, Murs, Scarub, Sunspot Jonz, and The Grouch) officially reunited for a regional tour and hit the road as part of the 10th annual How The Grouch Stole Christmas Tour.

Members

Current
 Aesop - vocals
 Bicasso - vocals, production
 Eligh - vocals, production
 Luckyiam - vocals
 Scarub - vocals, production
 Sunspot Jonz - vocals, production
 The Grouch - vocals, production

Former
 Arata - vocals
 Murs - vocals

Discography

Studio albums
 Angelz Wit Dirty Faces (2000)
 Almost Famous (2001)
 Creative Differences (2004)
 Classic (2005)

Compilation albums
 UHB I (1996)
 UHB II (1996)
 UHB III: Against All Odds (1997)
 UHB IV: Stop & Retaliate (1999)
 The Underworld (2000)
 UHB V: Legacy 2099 (2002)
 Crappy Old Shit (2003)
 The Four Track Avengers (2004)
 Legendary Music Volume 1 (2006)
 Legendary Music Volume 2 (2008)

EPs
 Foxhole EP (1999)
 The Gathering (2008)

Singles
 "Gotta Question for Ya / Night Prowler / Forces of Nature" (2001)
 "Awakening / Fill My Drink Up" (2004)
 "Damn It Feels Good / Whatizit?" (2004)
 "Blast Your Radio" (2004)
 "Down for Nothin' / Brand New" (2005)
 "Never Fallin' / Good Fun" (2005)
 "She Wants Me" (2008)
 "Trojan Horse" (2012)
 “Legendaries” (2021)

DVDs
 Street Legendz (2004)
 Broke Ass Summer Jam (2007)

References

Further reading

External links
 
 
 

Hip hop collectives
Hip hop groups from California
Musical groups from Los Angeles